The Johns Hopkins Institute for Policy Studies is a leading public policy school affiliated with Johns Hopkins University in Baltimore, Maryland. It seeks to improve the response of government, businesses, and nonprofit institutions locally, nationally, and internationally to such challenges as poverty, urban decline, and regional changes. Under the leadership of Don Steinwachs, it offers a Master of Public Policy and boasts 3 affiliated research institutes, 16 full-time faculty or research fellows and 8 joint faculty.

Degree Programs
Master in Public Policy (MPP) – a multidisciplinary program offered as a 2-year full-time master.  It was first offered in 1992, and combines a rigorous curriculum with participation in faculty research on social and urban policy issues or the nonprofit sector.
The Institute also sponsors two research programs - the International Fellows in Urban Studies and the International Fellows in Philanthropy.

Research Centers
Center for Civil Society Studies
International Society for Third Sector Research
Sar Levitan Center for Social Policy Studies

Research Areas
Baltimore & Maryland
Children & Youth
Jobs & Welfare
Nonprofit Sector

External links
 Official site
 Masters in Public Policy Degree

Institute for Policy Studies
Public administration schools in the United States
Public policy schools